Susan Peters (1921–1952) was an American stage, film and television actress.

Susan or Sue Peters may refer to:

 Susan Peters (politician), Republican who serves on the Sacramento County Board of Supervisors
 Susan Peters (TV anchor), American TV anchor
 Susan Peters (Nigerian actress) (born 1980)
Sue Peters, character in Worzel Gummidge (TV series)